Ruth Ellen Riley Hunter (born August 28, 1979) is a retired American professional basketball player (a center), playing most recently for the Atlanta Dream in the Women's National Basketball Association (WNBA). Her Notre Dame team won the NCAA women's championship in 2001, and her Detroit Shock team won the WNBA championship in 2003 and 2006. Riley was the Most Valuable Player in the 2001 and 2003 championship series, becoming the first person to win the MVP awards in both the NCAA and the WNBA championships. She has also played on teams that won the National Women's Basketball League (NWBL) championship, the gold medal at the Olympic Games, and the 2010 EuroCup Championship. In 2019, Riley was inducted into the Women's Basketball Hall of Fame.

In March 2016, Riley participated in Mogul's IAmAMogul campaign for inspiring women to believe that they have the "power to shape the world through their voices and actions." She was the general manager for the San Antonio Stars from May 2016 until the team's sale and relocation to Las Vegas in the 2017-18 off-season. In 2022, she joined the Miami Heat front office as the Senior Director of Team Development.

Early years
Riley was born in Ransom, Kansas and grew up in Macy, Indiana. While attending North Miami Middle/High School outside Denver, Indiana, she was on the basketball, volleyball and track teams. It was in high school that she began her practice of wearing a headband while playing. During her four years at high school she scored 1,372 points, acquired 1,011 rebounds and blocked 427 shots. She averaged 26 points a game as a senior, and had her jersey number (25) retired by the high school.

College years
In her freshman year at Notre Dame, Riley played in all 32 of the team's games, starting in the final 26. Thereafter she was the starting center in all but one of Notre Dame's games. She was a mainstay of the team in all four years, and consistently ranked high in the nation among women basketball players in field goal percentage and blocked shots. In both her junior and senior years she was an Associated Press First Team All-American selection. As a senior, she won the Naismith Award and was the Associated Press Player of the Year. In addition, she was the 2000-01 Verizon Academic All-American of the Year for the University Division I.

The highlight of her college career came in the 2001 NCAA tournament. In the championship game, Notre Dame was trailing Purdue, 66–64, when Riley scored the tying field goal. Then, with 5.8 seconds left and the score still tied, Riley drew a foul. She made both free throws to give Notre Dame its final 68–66 edge and its first women's national championship. Notre Dame coach Muffet McGraw, when asked about the critical play on which Riley was fouled, said, "it's the same play we've been running all season. It's called: 'Get the ball to Ruth.'" Riley was the Most Outstanding Player of that year's Final Four. The only player in Notre Dame women's basketball history to score 2,000 career points and grab 1,000 career rebounds, Riley was a two-time first-team Academic All-American in both 2000 and '01. In 1999, Riley led the nation in field goal percentage shooting 68.3% to become the first Irish player to rank first in an NCAA statistical category.

Riley graduated from Notre Dame in 2001 with a degree in psychology, having made the Dean's List every semester. She finished her Notre Dame career with 2,072 points, and school records for rebounds (1,007), blocked shots (370), and field goal percentage (.632).

Honors
 2× First-team All-American (2000, 2001)
 Naismith Player of the Year (2001)
 NCAA champion (2001)
 NCAA Final Four MOP (2001)
 Sports Illustrated Player of the Year (2001)
 Big East Player of the Year (2001)
 Academic All-American of the Year for Division I (2001)
 3× Big East Defensive Player of the Year (1999–2001)
Edward "Moose" Krause Distinguished Service Award (2015)
Atlantic Coast Conference Women's Basketball Legend (2014)
Ten Outstanding Young Persons of the World (TOYP) by JCI (2014)
CoSIDA Academic All-American Hall of Fame (2012)
Henry P. Iba Citizen Athlete of the Year Award (2010)
Notre Dame's Basketball Ring of Honor Inductee (2010)
WNBA Hall Of Fame Inductee (2019)

Notre Dame statistics
Source

Education
Bachelor of Arts - Psychology - Magna Cum Laude - University of Notre Dame (2001)

Executive MBA –Magna Cum Laude - University of Notre Dame (2016)

Professional career

WNBA
On April 20, 2001, Riley was selected by the Miami Sol as the fifth overall pick in the 2001 WNBA draft. She came off the bench for the first 12 games. On July 1, she made her first professional start, on the road against the Los Angeles Sparks, and started for the rest of the season.

Her second season (2002) was a difficult one. After playing well in the preseason, she broke a finger the day before the regular season started. She could not play for the Sol's first several games – the first time in her career she had missed a game because of an injury. She returned, playing with a splint on her hand, but lost her starting spot. During the WNBA's off-season, she played in Valencia, Spain.

After Riley's second season with the Sol, that franchise folded. On April 25, 2003 the WNBA held a special one-round dispersal draft, in which the remaining WNBA teams could select players from the Sol and from the Portland Fire, which had also folded. The Detroit Shock, by virtue of having the worst regular-season record in the WNBA in 2002, received the first pick in the dispersal draft, and used it to select Riley.

In Riley's first season with the Shock (2003), she was a key member of the team. She bettered each of her previous WNBA season totals in points, rebounds, blocked shots, and assists. The Shock, in a notable turnaround, went from a 2002 season with the worst record in the league (9-23) to a 2003 season with the best record (25-9) and a victory in the WNBA Championship. In the finals, the Shock defeated the two-time defending champion Los Angeles Sparks to win Detroit's first WNBA title. Riley was named the MVP of the WNBA finals.

Riley continued to play for the Shock in the 2004, 2005, and 2006 seasons. In 2005, she was selected for the Eastern Conference team in the WNBA All-Star Game. In 2006, she was the starting center when the Shock won its second WNBA championship, defeating the Sacramento Monarchs.

In February 2007, she was traded to the San Antonio Silver Stars in exchange for Katie Feenstra. The Shock also received the right to exchange first-round draft picks with the Silver Stars in 2008. The Chicago Sky signed the veteran 6-foot-5 center and two-time WNBA champion Riley, the team announced on Monday February sixth 2012.

Riley was waived by Chicago on 5/23/13.

On June 18, 2013, Riley signed with Atlanta after a roster spot opened up when Sancho Lyttle was suspended following her departure to play six games for her national team.

NWBL
The WNBA off-season was when the National Women's Basketball League operated. It provided a showcase for players hoping to make a WNBA team, and also attracted established WNBA players. In the fall of 2003, Riley joined the Colorado Chill of the NWBL. On April 1, 2005, in her second season, the Chill won the NWBL championship.

In Riley's third season with the Chill, she broke her thumb in a preseason workout and missed the team's first 14 games. She returned to action on March 21, 2006. She played in the last four regular-season games, all of which the Chill won to finish tied for the regular-season championship. In the playoffs, the Chill won both its games to repeat as NWBL champions. Riley was named as the playoff MVP.

Spanish League
After the WNBA's 2005 season, Riley played for Yaya Maria Porta XI in the 2005–06 season of the Spanish League. In January 2009 she signed for Rivasecópolis, and played again in the Spanish League.

Polish League
Riley played the 2006-07 European season for Lotos Gdynia in the Polish League. This club was long the European home for fellow WNBA player Margo Dydek, and also at one time featured another American WNBA star in Katie Smith.

Greek league
In January 2010, the Athinaikos club in the Greek league announced that Riley would join it for the remainder of its season.  She replaced LaToya Davis, who broke her wrist. In April 2010,  Riley helped Athinaikos to win their first EuroCup Women's Basketball Title.

International competition
While in college, Riley played on the U.S. team in the 1999 World University Games in Palma de Mallorca, Spain. The team won the silver medal.

In 2002, she practiced with the USA Women's Senior National Team, but did not make the final cut to play in the Basketball World Championship.

In 2004, she again practiced with the USA Women's Senior National Team and played in several of its games. She was selected for the 2004 U.S. Women's Olympic Team. In Olympic play, the team was undefeated and won the gold medal.

Community and global outreach

Nothing But Nets
Ruth Riley supports a number charitable organizations.  Since its inception in December 2006, Riley has been a spokesperson of the UN Foundation's Nothing But Nets, a global campaign that saves lives through the strategic prevention of Malaria. Through her work with the Nothing But Nets campaign, Riley has made multiple trips to different regions in Africa helping to amplify awareness of the malaria disease. In August 2008, Ruth helped raise money for Nothing But Nets during a San Antonio Silver Stars 5k run/walk. As a result of her efforts, Riley won August's WNBA Community Assist Award in 2008.

"No Kid Hungry"
Riley was introduce to Share Our Strength at the NBA All-Star Jam Session.  Share Our Strength is a national nonprofit committed to ending childhood hunger in America by making sure that children in need are enrolled in federal programs.  It invests in community organizations fighting hunger, teaches families how to cook healthy meals on a budget, and builds public-private partnerships to end hunger on a national and state level.  Riley, stopped by the booth to take the No Kid Hungry pledge and found out that they were launching an Illinois Initiative that March.  She offered to help in any way she could and was subsequently asked to speak at their at the official launch.  In the summer of 2012, Ruth, along with the NBA/WNBA joined with Share Our Strength to connect more than 50,000 youth to free meals in the summer across the United States.

Other activities

Riley wrote a children's book, The Spirit of Basketball, with co-author Paul Hickey and illustrator Christopher Hiller, that was published in 2005. According to Riley, the message of the book was "that basketball is the same no matter where you live or what language you speak".

On January 26, 2005, Riley made her debut as a color commentator for a Notre Dame women's basketball game.

, Riley was the vice president of the WNBA Players' Union.

In 2009, President George W. Bush appointed Riley to the President's Council on Physical Fitness and Sports.

In 2015, Riley was awarded the Moose Krause Distinguished Service Award by the Notre Dame Monogram Club.

In 2018 she became one of the broadcast analysts for the Miami Heat of the NBA, the first woman in that role for the Heat. She is not related to Pat Riley, the president of the Heat.

Personal
Riley's height is variously listed as 6' 4" and 6' 5". She has said that she is "six-foot-four and a half to be exact" (1.94 m).

In 2001, while playing for the Sol, Riley bought a home in South Beach, and returned to the area in the offseason even when playing for other organizations.

Riley married Benjamin Hunter, another Notre Dame alum and varsity football player on New Year's Day 2018.

References

External links
 Riley's website
 Riley's biography - on WNBA website
 
 Riley's biography - on USA Basketball website
 
 Riley's blog - on WNBA website
 Riley profile for Lotos Gdynia 
 "Life of Riley Is Overflowing with Dreams Fulfilled" - profile in The Detroit News
 Press release on her trade to the San Antonio Silver Stars

1979 births
Living people
All-American college women's basketball players
American children's writers
American expatriate basketball people in China
American expatriate basketball people in Spain
American women's basketball players
Atlanta Dream players
Basketball players at the 2004 Summer Olympics
Basketball players from Kansas
Centers (basketball)
Chicago Sky players
Detroit Shock players
Liaoning Flying Eagles players
Medalists at the 2004 Summer Olympics
Miami Sol players
Notre Dame Fighting Irish women's basketball players
Olympic gold medalists for the United States in basketball
People from Miami County, Indiana
People from Ness County, Kansas
San Antonio Stars players
Universiade medalists in basketball
Universiade silver medalists for the United States
Women's National Basketball Association All-Stars
Women's National Basketball Association general managers
United States women's national basketball team players